The Château de Cabriès is an historic castle in Cabriès, Bouches-du-Rhône, Provence-Alpes-Côte d'Azur, France. It houses the Musée Edgar Mélik.

History
The castle was built in the 8th century. In 1237, Anselme Férus sold it to Ramon Berenguer IV, Count of Provence. It was restored in the 18th century, with French windows added.

In 1934, the northern aisle was acquired by painter Edgar Mélik, who painted its walls. It now houses a museum named after him.

References

Castles in Provence-Alpes-Côte d'Azur